Equestrian at the 2018 Asian Games was held at the Jakarta International Equestrian Park, Jakarta, Indonesia, from 20 to 30 August 2018.

There were three equestrian disciplines: dressage, eventing and jumping. All three disciplines are further divided into individual and team contests for a total of six events.

Schedule

Medalists

Medal table

Participating nations
A total of 122 athletes from 21 nations competed in equestrian at the 2018 Asian Games:

Officials
Appointment of officials was as follows:

Dressage
  Maria Schwennsen (Ground Jury President)
  Elisabeth Max-Theurer (Ground Jury Member)
  Susan Hobson (Ground Jury Member)
  Peter Holler (Ground Jury Member)
  Freddy Leyman (Ground Jury Member)
  Mary Seefried (Technical Delegate)

Jumping
  Khalil Ibrahim Murad (Ground Jury President)
  Karim Badaro (Ground Jury Member)
  Kazu Hirayama (Ground Jury Member)
  Gerard Kuh (Ground Jury Member)
  Werner Deeg (Course Designer)
  Olaf Petersen (Technical Delegate)

Eventing
  Christina Klingspor (Ground Jury President)
  Eric Lieby (Ground Jury Member)
  PollyAnn Huntington (Ground Jury Member)
  John Nicholson (Course Designer)
  Neil Mackenzie-Hall (Technical Delegate)

References

External links
Equestrian at the 2018 Asian Games
Official Result Book – Equestrian

 
2018
Equestrian
2018 in equestrian
2018 Asian Games